Unknown Death 2002 is the debut mixtape by Swedish rapper Yung Lean. It was released on July 9, 2013 by Mishka NYC. It serves as Yung Lean's first full length project, and his breakout mixtape, bringing more attention to both Lean and Swedish hip hop. Despite opening to negative reception from music critics, Unknown Death 2002 quickly gained a cult following by both fans and listeners.

Critical reception 
Unknown Death 2002 received mixed to negative reviews. Pat Levy of Consequence of Sound said "Many of these songs serve no greater purpose than something to get depressed and/or high too, both for Yung Lean and his fans. The end result of his Sad Boy persona is a debut mixtape that showcases promising producers, a burgeoning microgenre, and a rapper confused about how good he might be."

Track listing

References

External links
 

2013 mixtape albums
Yung Lean albums
Mishka NYC albums